"Lucky Man" is a song by the English progressive rock supergroup Emerson, Lake & Palmer, from the group's 1970 self-titled debut album. Written by Greg Lake when he was 12 years old and recorded by the trio using improvised arrangements, 
the song contains one of rock music's earliest instances of a Moog synthesizer solo. "Lucky Man" was released as a single in 1970 and reached the top 20 in the Netherlands. The song also charted in the United States and Canada. The single was re-released in 1973 and charted again in the U.S. and Canada.

Background and composition
The origin of the song, as stated by Greg Lake in interviews, is that it was the first song he wrote, when his mother bought him a guitar when he was 12. With the first chords he learned (D, A minor, E minor, and G), he wrote an acoustic version of the song.

The song came to be used on Emerson, Lake & Palmer's debut album when they needed one more song. Lake played the version he had written from childhood, and the rest of the band did not like it, or feel it would fit. Lake then worked on it in the studio with Carl Palmer. Lake added numerous overdubs of bass, triple-tracked acoustic guitars, electric guitar, and harmony vocals until it "sounded like a record." This version of the song — with a second electric guitar solo in place of where Emerson would later overdub his Moog solo — is featured on the album's deluxe edition.

Unlike several songs on the album, which use a distorted fuzz bass to sound like a guitar, "Lucky Man" is an acoustic ballad. 
The lyrics tell the story of a man who had everything, went to war, and died. A Moog synthesizer solo, recorded in one take, is performed by Keith Emerson at the end of song, making it one of the first rock compositions in which a Moog was a featured solo instrument (The Monkees were the first in 1967 with "Daily Nightly"). 
The solo begins as an ominous drone on a low D before leaping up two octaves and using the glide control throughout.

When asked in an interview if he felt "lucky" to have written the song, Lake responded:
I did write “Lucky Man” when I was 12.  My mum bought me a guitar and I was very lucky in that sense, the answer was yes instead of no.  There was the first bit of luck because had the answer been no, my life would have probably been totally different.  I got the guitar and I learned the first four chords that were D, G, A Minor and E Minor and with those chords I wrote “Lucky Man”.  I truly cannot remember everything about writing it other than I think it struck me as being a sort of minstrel type of event with these chords, G, D, E Minor and A Minor, gave me this sort of minstrel feeling.  “Lucky Man” has kind of an almost medieval element tone to it.  It is like a medieval folk song in a way.   That was the essence of the idea.  I wrote the song in its entirety and I finished it and I remembered it.  As far as its significance regarding me and how lucky I was, I suppose it does really.  You cannot disassociate the tune, the song has been very lucky for me.  It came about because of a piece of good fortune, which was my mother giving me the guitar and it has been lucky for me ever since.  I would say if I was going to be honest, I have been very lucky in life. I certainly have been.

Release and reception
"Lucky Man" was released in 1970 and reached number 48 on the U.S. Billboard Hot 100, number 25 in Canada, and number 14 in the Netherlands. The single was re-released in January 1973 and peaked at number 51 on the U.S. Hot 100 and number 71 in Canada.

In a 1971 issue of Billboard, the song was described as being "loaded with programming appeal and should make its mark on the sales charts." Paul Stump, in his 1997 History of Progressive Rock, remarked that "The pre-Raphaelite imagery ... is forgettable, the melody more so, and only the flanging and phasing of Emerson's Moog, flitting from one channel to the other and through a range of frequencies which augured well for future experiments with the instrument, rescues it." In a review of the 2004 film Moog, MTV's Kurt Loder said "'Lucky Man' demonstrated for delighted keyboard players everywhere that it was at last possible for them to blow amp-shredding lead guitarists right off the stage, if they so chose." Former Moog technician David Van Koevering praised "Lucky Man" as the instrument's "big breakthrough" in popular music.

Emerson, however, has remained somewhat embarrassed about the song, saying "That's the solo I've had to live with!" He noted that during the recording of the solo, he was "just jamming around", and was "devastated" to learn that it was going to be used in the final version of the song without having the chance to record another take, as all the tracks had been used. When called upon to play Lucky Man in concerts in later years, Emerson found he was not sure how the solo went: 
<blockquote>...late 70s I hadn't played the solo from Lucky Man for quite a long time, so I actually called up Keyboard Magazine. I knew they'd done a transcription of the solo; "do you think I could have a copy of the solo from Lucky Man?" They said "What? Keith Emerson wants a copy of..." I hadn't played it...they managed to transcribe it quite accurately...I said "it'll save me time if you send me what you came up with..." So that was it. Thank you Keyboard Magazine and Dominic Milano, I think.</blockquote>

Live versus studio versions
"Lucky Man" is typically not performed in concert the way it was recorded. While the studio version is a full band piece (with much more input from Lake), most live versions see Lake playing the song by himself on acoustic guitar. Emerson explains: 
It is a shame that we really can’t perform it the same way it is on the album. There’s a lot of double-tracked vocals. Greg’s playing electric, bass and acoustic guitar on it. If we had really thought about it, and we ourselves, had wanted to release it as a single, then we would have considered these points, and possibly re-arranged it so we could have done it some way on stage. Now we come out and people want to hear it. Greg performs it as an acoustic piece and I guess it's rather disappointing to some people because they want to hear the recorded version. There we were, in the position of it having been released and us not knowing that people want to hear it, and the way it was done on the album being impossible for us to do on stage.

The group did attempt to recreate the studio track onstage in their earlier years, as evidenced by the band arrangement found on the album Live at the Mar y Sol Festival '72, but this was quickly dropped in favor of Lake's solo acoustic arrangement through most of ELP's touring years. A band arrangement of "Lucky Man" would become the typical live version of the song starting on the Emerson, Lake & Powell tour in 1986 and continuing after Emerson & Lake reunited with Carl Palmer in 1992 until their final performance in 2010. In some performances, the middle guitar solo is played by Lake on guitar; in others, the guitar solo is played by Emerson on organ before he switches to the Moog for the ending solo.

In a rare vocal appearance, Keith Emerson "sings" one of the song's verses through a vocoder on the rendition of "Lucky Man" appearing on Emerson, Lake & Powell's Live in Concert record. This marks his only vocal contribution to any of his music aside from the similarly computerized voice parts in "Karn Evil 9: Third Impression." Emerson's vocal part never reappears in following live performances.

Track listing
7" Single
 "Lucky Man" (Lake) – 4:35
 "Knife-Edge" (Emerson, Frazer, Janáček, Lake) – 5:04

7" Atlantic Oldies Series Single
 "Lucky Man" (Lake) – 4:35
 "From The Beginning" (Lake) – 5:04

Personnel
Keith Emerson:  Moog synthesizer
Greg Lake: acoustic guitar, electric guitar, bass, vocals
Carl Palmer: drums, percussion

Chart performance

In popular culture
The introductory track on Flower Travellin' Band's 1972 album Made in Japan is an advertisement for a concert at Stanley Park Stadium by Flower Travellin' Band, Emerson, Lake & Palmer, Bob Seger and Teegarden & Van Winkle, with a clip of "Lucky Man" playing in the background.
The song appeared in the love scene at the end of the German film NVA (2005).
The song is referenced in Sun Kil Moon's 2008 album April, in a song of the same name.
In 2010, the song appeared in The Simpsons episode "Million Dollar Maybe", where Homer Simpson found an Emerson, Lake & Palmer CD and sang to the song as he drove.
It is used as the closing theme music on CBC Radio One's The Next Chapter.
In 2013, the song appeared on American television as the background music in a Volkswagen Passat commercial.
The song appeared in the 2018 film BlacKkKlansmanThe song also appeared in the 2019 Netflix movie Extremely Wicked, Shockingly Evil and Vile.''

See also
 List of anti-war songs

References

Songs about luck
1970s ballads
Emerson, Lake & Palmer songs
1970 songs
Songs written by Greg Lake
Song recordings produced by Greg Lake
1970 debut singles
Island Records singles
Cotillion Records singles
Folk ballads
Rock ballads